Tabanözü can refer to:

 Tabanözü, Bartın
 Tabanözü, Bitlis
 Tabanözü, Kovancılar